The 2005 Colonial Athletic Association baseball tournament was held at Brooks Field in Wilmington, North Carolina, from May 26 through 29.  The event determined the champion of the Colonial Athletic Association for the 2005 season.  Third-seeded VCU won the tournament for the third time and earned the CAA's automatic bid to the 2005 NCAA Division I baseball tournament.

Entering the event, former member East Carolina had won the most championships, with seven.  Among active members, Old Dominion led with three titles while George Mason and VCU had each won twice and UNC Wilmington and William & Mary had won once.

Format and seeding
The top six teams from the CAA's round-robin regular season qualified for the tournament.  Teams were seeded by conference winning percentage.  They played a double-elimination tournament.

Bracket and results

All-Tournament Team
The following players were named to the All-Tournament Team.

Most Valuable Player
Tim St. Clair was named Tournament Most Valuable Player.  St. Clair was a first baseman and designated hitter for VCU.

References

Tournament
Colonial Athletic Association Baseball Tournament
Colonial Athletic Association baseball tournament
Colonial Athletic Association baseball tournament
College baseball tournaments in North Carolina
Baseball competitions in Wilmington, North Carolina